Majid Abdolhosseini (born March 10, 1972) is a retired professional Iranian karateka. In 1995, Abdolhosseini won a gold medal in the Philippines and another gold medal in Macau in 2005.

Abdolhosseini competed in five world karate championships, in 1996 Rdyvzhanyrv Brazil, 1998 Sun City, South Africa, 2000 Munich, Germany, 2002 Madrid, Apain and 2004 Mexico and in five Asian Karate Championships, from 1995 to 2005 and the Asian games in Bangkok, Thailand in 1998.

From 1990 to 2006 Abdolhosseini was a player in the national team of Iran in numerous competitions: Karate World Championships, Asian Championships, Asian Games.

Abdolhosseni was appointed coach of the Iran under-21 karate team in March 2014.

References

External links 
 فدراسیون کاراته
 عبدالحسيني:تشكیل تیم امید کاراته راهی برای رسیدن به موفقیت‌های بیشتر است

1972 births
Living people
People from Qom
Iranian male karateka
Karateka at the 1998 Asian Games